The 733d Aircraft Control and Warning Squadron is an inactive United States Air Force unit. It was last assigned to the Oklahoma City Air Defense Sector, Aerospace Defense Command, stationed at Eagle Pass Air Force Station, Texas. It was inactivated on 1 August 1963.

The unit was a General Surveillance Radar squadron providing for the air defense of the United States.

Lineage
 Activated as 733d Aircraft Control and Warning Squadron on 8 September 1956
 Discontinued on 1 August 1963

Assignments
 33d Air Division, 8 September 1956
 Oklahoma City Air Defense Sector, 1 January 1960
 4752d Air Defense Wing, 1 September 1961
 Oklahoma City Air Defense Sector, 25 June-1 August 1963

Stations
 Oklahoma City AFS, Oklahoma, 8 September 1956
 Eagle Pass AFS, Texas, 3 July 1957 – 1 August 1963

References

Bibliography
  A Handbook of Aerospace Defense Organization 1946–1980, by Lloyd H. Cornett and Mildred W. Johnson, Office of History, Aerospace Defense Center, Peterson Air Force Base, Colorado
 Winkler, David F. (1997), Searching the skies: the legacy of the United States Cold War defense radar program. Prepared for United States Air Force Headquarters Air Combat Command.

Radar squadrons of the United States Air Force
Aerospace Defense Command units